Julie Claire (born May 31, 1971) is an  American actress known for her recurring roles on the TV series Dirt and Devious Maids. She's also appeared in 24 as Eden Linley and in Web Therapy as Robin Griner. She appeared in the 2013 comedy film Movie 43.

Filmography

Film

Television

External links
 

Living people
American film actresses
American television actresses
20th-century American actresses
21st-century American actresses
1974 births